The Sin That Was His is a lost 1920 silent film drama directed by Hobart Henley and starring William Faversham. It was produced by Selznick Pictures and released through Select Pictures.

Cast
William Faversham - Raymond Chapelle
Lucy Cotton - Valerie Lafleur
Pedro de Cordoba - Father Aubert
Miss Sherman - Madam Lafleur
Lule Warrenton - Madam Blondin
Robert Conville - Blondin
John Barton - Bishop

References

External links

1920 films
American silent feature films
Lost American films
Films directed by Hobart Henley
Films based on Canadian novels
American black-and-white films
Selznick Pictures films
Silent American drama films
1920 drama films
1920 lost films
Lost drama films
1920s American films